GoToGate is an online travel agency and seller of air travel based out of Uppsala, Sweden, and one of the most prominent trade names of the Swedish travel corporation Etraveli Group AB (which itself is undergoing regulatory approval of an acquisition by Booking Holdings). GoToGate claims it serves 12 million customers a year across 77 countries and fills 140 Boeing 737 planes every day. Prior to the acquisition by Booking Holdings, GoToGate was used for a time as the flight provider for Booking.com for various European countries.

Under Etraveli, GoToGate also operates MyTrip.com, whose US division lists GoToGate as its owner.

GoToGate has been subject to frequent controversy and criticism, often targeting its poor customer service despite boasting "unbeatable low prices". The agency has a Better Business Bureau grade of "F" and hovers around a 1-star rating with reviewers frequently calling the website a scam.

History 
Sources conflict on when both GoToGate and Etraveli were founded. One report suggests that Etraveli was founded in 2000 while another source says Etraveli was founded in 2007 from the merger of Seat24 (Sweden) and SRG Online.

GoToGate is listed by Etraveli as the brand which gave the Scandinavian holding company international marketshare. The site is described as especially successful in the United Kingdom and France, and in 2015, Etraveli expanded GoToGate to Singapore, Australia, Japan, and 12 other new markets. Etraveli lists GoToGate as its most successful brand and foresees it remaining the most successful subsidiary of Etraveli.

In 2015, Etraveli was acquired by ProSiebenSat.1 Media and placed under its investment subsidiary 7Travel for €235 million. Later in 2017, Etraveli was sold to CVC Capital Partners for $570 million USD, or €508 million. Later on the same year the group was merged with Greek online travel agency e-Travel S.A

In 2021, Etraveli Group was acquired again by Booking Holdings, two weeks after it bought hotel distributor Getaroom, for €1.63 billion. The Government of the United Kingdom's Competition and Markets Authority has launched an enquiry into the acquisition, and as of November 2022, Booking Holdings is continuing to defend its proposed acquisition. The deal is also under investigation by the European Union, which had been assessing the move since October and under a more extensive investigation by the European Commissioner for Competition since November.

Criticisms 
GoToGate's, MyTrip's and Supersaver's most frequent criticisms target its speed of delivering refunds to customers. London-based journalist Anna Tims of The Guardian claimed that sixteen months after requesting a valid refund, the company refused to provide her with one. She additionally outlined and slammed GoToGate's policy in which the agency would take a cut out of any refund given to a passenger from an airline unless the customer purchased a "platinum support package". Tims' complaints against the company were mirrored and expanded upon by Which?, further slamming GoToGate and fellow online travel agency Lastminute.com for illegally refusing refunds and charging customers "administration fees" just to process refunds. Customer complaints against GoToGate also attracted the attention of CBS News, which when documenting a flight purchase from Illinois to Serbia, highlighted that no representatives responded when the company was called.

Simon Calder, a journalist for The Independent, warned consumers that booking airline tickets through GoToGate and myTrip, which he noted to be among the more untrustworthy travel agencies, would only be worth the money paid if both the flight was sold for a substantially cheaper price than a more trusted agency and the flight was being booked very close to its departure.

The New Zealand Herald has attributed GoToGate's business practices, along with those of other online travel agencies, as a cause for their overall decline after the COVID-19 pandemic.

Notes

References

External links 
 Official Website

Online travel agencies
Metasearch engines